Nameless is a 1923 Austrian silent drama film directed by Michael Curtiz and starring Victor Varconi and Mary Kid. The film's sets were designed by the art directors Artur Berger and Julius von Borsody.

Cast
 Victor Varconi as Jean Moeller 
 Mary Kid as Dorothy Holston 
 Paul Gardner as Paul Holston
 Hans Lackner as Prof. Dr. Peterson
 Maria Raffe as Frau Holston
 Karl Farkas
 Arthur Gottlein

See also
 Michael Curtiz filmography

Bibliography
 Alan K. Rode. Michael Curtiz: A Life in Film. University Press of Kentucky, 2017.

External links

1923 films
Austrian black-and-white films
Austrian silent feature films
Films directed by Michael Curtiz
Films produced by Arnold Pressburger